The term Nile Valley Civilizations is sometimes used in Afrocentrism or Pan-Africanism to group a number of interrelated and interlocking, regionally distinct cultures that formed along the length of the Nile Valley from its headwaters in Ethiopia, Egypt and Sudan to its mouth in the Mediterranean Sea.

Introduced around 1970, it was popularized by Ivan Van Sertima in the 1980s and saw wide use in Afrocentric publications during the 1990s, e.g. 
Festus Ugboaja Ohaegbulam, Towards an understanding of the African experience from historical and contemporary perspectives, University Press of America (1990);  Runoko Rashidi, Introduction to the study of African clasical [sic] civilizations (1992), Walter Arthur McCray, The Black Presence in the Bible: Discovering the Black and African Identity of Biblical Persons and Nations, Urban Ministries Inc, (1995), etc.

References

Ancient Egypt
Pan-Africanism